In typography, a font superfamily or typeface superfamily is a font family containing
fonts that fall into multiple classifications.

The norm in a superfamily is to start from an identical character shape; class-specific features such as serifs are added to that shape. The result is a set of fonts that, while belonging to different classes such as sans and serif, have a similar appearance. Generally the sans-serif member of a superfamily will be a humanist design to complement the serif. 

Other superfamilies may include fonts grouped together for a common purpose that are not exactly complementary in letterform structure.

Notable superfamilies

Same letterforms
 Berlingske by Playtype, comprising Berlingske Serif, Berlingske Serif Display, Berlingske Serif Stencil, Berlingske sans, Berlingske Sans Display, Berlingske sans Stencil, Berlingske Slab, Berlingske Slab Display, Berlingske Slab Stencil, Berlingske Typewriter.
 FF Meta by Erik Spiekermann, comprising FF Meta (sans), FF Meta Serif and FF Meta Headline
 FF Nexus by Martin Majoor, comprising FF Nexus Sans, FF Nexus Serif, FF Nexus Mix and FF Nexus Typewriter
 FF Quadraat by Fred Smeijers, comprising FF Quadraat (serif), FF Quadraat Sans, FF Quadraat Display and FF Quadraat Headliner
 FF Scala by Martin Majoor, comprising FF Scala (serif) and FF Scala Sans
 FF Seria by Martin Majoor,	comprising FF Seria (serif) and FF Seria Sans
 Generis by Erik Faulhaber,	comprising Generis Sans, Generis Serif, Generis Simple and Generis Slab
 ITC Humana by Timothy Donaldso,	comprising ITC Humana Sans, ITC Humana Serif and ITC Humana Script
ITC Officina by Erik Spiekermann and Just van Rossum, comprising ITC Officina Sans, ITC Officina Serif and ITC Officina Display
 Linotype Authentic by Karin Huschka, comprising Linotype Authentic Sans, Linotype Authentic Serif, Linotype Authentic Small Serif and Linotype Authentic Stencil
 Linotype Compatil by Olaf Leu, comprising Compatil Text, Compatil Fact, Compatil Letter and Compatil Exquisit
 Lucida by Charles Bigelow and Kris Holmes,	comprising Lucida Sans, Lucida Serif, Lucida Typewriter Sans, Lucida Typewriter Serif and Lucida Math
 Merriweather by Eben Sorkin, comprising Merriweather and Merriweather Sans
Penumbra by Lance Hidy, comprising Penumbra Sans, Penumbra Serif, Penumbra Half Serif and Penumbra Flare
 PT Fonts by Alexandra Korolkova et al, comprising PT Serif, PT Sans and PT Mono.
 Rotis by Otl Aicher, comprising rotis serif, rotis semi-serif, rotis semi-sans and rotis sans
 Sassoon by Rosemary Sassoon and Adrian William,	comprising Sassoon Sans, Sassoon Book, Sassoon Primary, Sassoon Infant and Sassoon Sans Slope
 Source by Paul D. Hunt and Frank Grießhammer, comprising Source Sans Pro, Source Serif Pro and Source Code Pro
 Stone by Sumner Stone, comprising Stone Serif, Stone Sans and Stone Informal
 Thesis by Lucas de Groot,	comprising TheSans, TheSerif, TheMix and TheAntiqua
 Trajan both Trajan (serif, designed by Carol Twombly) and Trajan Sans. No lower-case.

Same purpose
 Computer Modern by Donald E. Knuth, comprising cmr (antiqua), cmss (grotesque) and cmtt (monospaced)
 DejaVu and Bitstream Vera comprising DejaVu Sans, DejaVu Sans Mono and DejaVu Serif.
 Droid by Steve Matteson, comprising Droid Sans, Droid Serif and Droid Sans Mono.
 IBM Plex by Mike Abbink, comprising IBM Plex Sans, IBM Plex Sans Condensed, IBM Plex Serif and IBM Plex Mono
 Noto fonts by Google, comprising Noto Sans, Noto Serif and Noto Mono, an expansion of the Droid family. It supports a wide range of languages.
 Roboto by Christian Robertson, comprising Roboto, Roboto Slab and Roboto Mono
 Corporate ASE by Kurt Weidemann, comprising antiqua, sans and Egyptienne
 Liberation by Steve Matteson, comprising Liberation Sans, Liberation Serif and Liberation Mono

Typography